Luciana Reis Barrella (born December 23, 1978 in Manaus) is a Brazilian female curler. She currently plays for the Vancouver, British Columbia-based national Brazilian team. She is right-handed.

Barrella and Marcio Cerquinho played at the 2019 World Mixed Doubles Curling Championship.

Teams

Women's

Mixed

Mixed doubles

References

External links
 
 
 Cool Curlings — Brazilian Wave
 Amazonense que faz parte da seleção brasileira de curling, tem esperanças de participar das Olimpíadas de Inverno em 2018 | Esportes | Acritica.com | Amazônia - Amazonas - Manaus 

1978 births
Living people
People from Manaus
Brazilian female curlers
Sportspeople from Amazonas (Brazilian state)